In planetary geology, a saxum (plural saxa) is a large surface boulder on an extraterrestrial body. So far the term has been used for:
 162173 Ryugu#Saxa
 101955 Bennu#IAU named features
 Dimorphos#Surface

Saxum is the Latin word for a rock. The feature name was introduced in 2019 for the Hayabusa 2 asteroid mission to Ryugu.

Planetary geology